Princess (Leult) Ijigayehu Amha Selassie (known during her life as Her Imperial Highness Princess Ijigayehu Asfaw Wossen; 1936–1976) was the eldest child of Crown Prince Asfaw Wossen of Ethiopia by his first wife, Princess Wolete Israel Seyoum and was the granddaughter to Emperor Haile Selassie.

Lineage and marriage
Through her mother's family she was a great-great granddaughter of Emperor Yohannes IV. Princess Ijigayehu was married to Dejazmach Fikre Selassie Hapte Mariam, the heir to the old Welega Kingdom of Leqa Naqamte, and brother to Woizero Atsede Habte- Mariam (wife of General Mulugeta Bulli) and Princess Mahisente Habte Mariam (wife of Prince Sahle Selassie). Dejazmach Fikre Selassie and Princess Ijigayehu were the parents of six children (all created Princes and Princesses by their grandfather Emperor Amha Selassie while in exile):

 Prince Samson Fikre Selassie (born 10 October 1954).
 Princess Rahel Fikre Selassie (born 19 December 1957).
 Princess Meheret Fikre Selassie (born 19 December 1959).
 Princess Aster Fikre Selassie (born 30 April 1960).
 Prince Bekere Fikre Selassie (born 1962).
 Prince Yishaq Fikre Selassie (born 1964).

Princess Ijigayehu notably accompanied her grandfather Emperor Haile Selassie on his state visit to Italy and also on his state visits to South Korea, Australia, and Malaysia.

Derg Uprising
Princess Ijigayehu was imprisoned with the rest of the Imperial family on September 11, 1974, the day before Emperor Haile Selassie was deposed by the Derg. She died in early 1976 after medical neglect while still in prison. She was buried at the Ketchene Medhan Alem Church in Addis Ababa by her children and her mother who were under surveillance but not imprisoned. Early the following year, all her children, along with other children of the Imperial family, escaped from Ethiopia.  Her husband remained imprisoned for 8 years and died in August 1996.

Honours

National 
  Dame Grand Cordon of the Order of the Queen of Sheba
  Refugee Medal (1944)
  Jubilee Medal (1955)
  Emperor Haile Selassie I Jubilee Medal (1966)

Foreign 
  Dame Grand Cross of the Order of Beneficence (Kingdom of Greece, 04/1959)
  Dame Grand Cross of the Order of Queen Kossomak (Kingdom of Cambodia, 04/05/1968)
  Dame Grand Cross of the Order of Merit of the Italian Republic (Italian Republic, 06/11/1970)

Ancestry

References

1976 deaths
Ethiopian princesses
Ethiopian Royal Family
1936 births
Grand Crosses of the Order of Beneficence (Greece)
Knights Grand Cross of the Order of Merit of the Italian Republic
Haile Selassie